Ana Isabel Martínez Martínez (born 7 December 1991) is a Spanish handball player for Club Balonmano Elche and on Spanish national team.

She participated at the 2018 European Women's Handball Championship.

References

Spanish female handball players
1991 births
Living people
Sportspeople from Elche
Expatriate handball players
Spanish expatriate sportspeople in France
Competitors at the 2013 Mediterranean Games
Mediterranean Games competitors for Spain